The Ruby Sea is the fifth and final full-length album by Thin White Rope.

Track listing

The chorus for "The Fish Song" was made up of various Frontier records staff and journalists, including Melody Maker's Everett True.

Credits
 Guy Kyser – Banjo, Guitar, Vocals
 Roger Kunkel –  Guitar, Vocals
 Stooert Odom – Bass, Guitarron, Vocals
 Matthew Abourezk – Drums, Percussion, Vocals
and
 Bill Noland – Piano
 Johanna Galos-Dopkins – Vocals
 Joe Romersa – Vocals
with
 Bill Noland – Producer, Engineer, Mixing
 Dave Lopez – Engineer, Mixing
 Yvette Roman – Photography
 Doug Erb – Art Direction

References

1991 albums
Thin White Rope albums
Frontier Records albums